Madame Satã is a 2002 Brazilian–French drama film directed by Karim Aïnouz. Shot in the neighborhoods of Lapa, Glória, Paquetá, and Centro in the Rio de Janeiro city, it tells the story of Madame Satã and premiered in the Un Certain Regard section at the 2002 Cannes Film Festival.

Cast
 Lázaro Ramos - João Francisco dos Santos / Madame Satã
 Marcélia Cartaxo - Laurita
 Flavio Bauraqui - Tabu
 Fellipe Marques - Renatinho
 Renata Sorrah - Vitória
 Emiliano Queiroz - Amador
 Giovana Barbosa - Firmina
 Ricardo Blat - José
 Guilherme Piva - Álvaro
 Marcelo Valle - Delegado
 Floriano Peixoto - Gregório
 Gero Camilo - Agapito
 Gláucio Gomes - Gordo no Danúbio (Fat man)
 Orã Figueiredo - Policial

References

External links

 

2002 biographical drama films
2002 films
Biographical films about entertainers
Biographical films about criminals
Brazilian biographical drama films
Brazilian crime drama films
Brazilian LGBT-related films
Films directed by Karim Aïnouz
Films set in 1932
Films set in Rio de Janeiro (city)
Films shot in Rio de Janeiro (city)
French LGBT-related films
2000s Portuguese-language films
2002 directorial debut films
2002 drama films
2000s French films